Elusa orion is a species of moth of the family Noctuidae. It was described by Walter Karl Johann Roepke in 1956, and is known from New Guinea.

References

Moths described in 1956
Hadeninae
Moths of New Guinea